The Worshipful Company of Arts Scholars is ranked 110th out of the City livery companies. Recognised as a Company without Livery in 2010, it was constituted a Livery Company on 11 February 2014 by the Court of Aldermen.

Masters Arts Scholars
2006–07: Lord Brooke of Sutton Mandeville CH FSA
2007–08: Geoffrey Bond OBE DL FSA
2008–09: Jonathan Horne MBE FSA
2009–10: Dr Geoff Egan FSA
2010–11: Mark Bridge
2011–12: Philippa Glanville OBE FSA
2012–13: Christopher Claxton Stevens
2013–14: Nicholas Somers FRICS
2014–15: Alderman Ian Luder CBE JP
2015–16: Alastair Leslie TD
2016–17: Tom Christopherson
2017–18: Dr Loyd Grossman CBE FRHistS
2018–19: Paul Viney
2019-20: Dr Georgina Gough FRGS
2020-22: John Spanner TD

Company Chaplain and Church
 The Revd Canon Roger Hall MBE
 Church of St Peter ad Vincula

References

External links

2014 establishments in England
Livery companies
Charities based in London
History of the City of London